Cosmic Explorer is a proposed third generation ground-based gravitational wave observatory. Cosmic Explorer uses the same L-shaped design as the LIGO detectors, except with ten times longer arms of 40 km each. This will significantly increase the sensitivity of the observatory allowing observation of the first black hole mergers in the Universe. In 2019 Cosmic Explorer team published a study about research needed over 2020s decade to build the observatory.

See also
Einstein Telescope

References

Gravitational wave observatories